Pointon is an English surname. Notable people with the surname include:

Bill Pointon (1920–2008), English footballer
Joe Pointon (1905–1939), English footballer
Malcolm Pointon (died 2007), English pianist and Alzheimer's sufferer
Marcia Pointon, British art historian
Neil Pointon (born 1964), English footballer
Ray Pointon (1947–2013), English footballer
Tom Pointon (1890 – after 1924), English footballer

English-language surnames